Favartia minirosea is a species of sea snail, a marine gastropod mollusk in the family Muricidae, the murex snails or rock snails.

Description

Distribution
This species occurs in the Caribbean Sea off Jamaica and Guadeloupe.

References

External links
 Abbott R.T. (1954). New Gulf of Mexico gastropods (Terebra and Ocenebra). The Nautilus. 68(2): 37-44, pl. 2
 Abbott R.T. (1954). New Gulf of Mexico gastropods (Terebra and Ocenebra). The Nautilus. 68(2): 37-44, pl. 2

Muricidae
Gastropods described in 1954